Mommy XXX is an American reality television web series directed and produced by John Ferrie and starring former porn star Demi Delia.  The show was produced by Teru Media and premiered on Sony Pictures Entertainment owned Crackle on June 18, 2009.  The show "chronicles the life of Demi Delia, an actively working porn star with two teenage children...". New episodes streamed on Thursday through September 10, 2009.

Overview
"Mommy XXX takes us inside Demi's home -- known as "the Castle or Compound"—in The Valley where porn wannabes and naive newcomers to the adult film world hang out. In documenting the day-to-day life of a busy mom 
who also happens to be a real-life porn star, Mommy XXX episodes will expose Demi Delia's personal side..."

Cast
Demi Delia
Chris Snail
Brandi Snail
Randy Spears

Episodes

References

External links
 Mommy XXX
 

2009 web series debuts
Documentary web series
American non-fiction web series
Crackle (streaming service) original programming
Erotic web series